The Arlington Recreation Ground (known as Arlington Oval) is a soccer stadium in Dulwich Hill, Sydney, Australia with a capacity of 6,000.

History
The venue was built in 1932 with a natural grass playing surface and a grandstand, on land which had previously been used as a brick works; the brick pits were infilled to greate the green space.

Empire Games
During the British Empire Games in 1938, women athletes competed at Arlington Oval. The grandstand was used in scenes from the Australian movie The First Kangaroos, which was named after the Australian Rugby League's inaugural international tour of England.

Revamped venue
In mid-August 2014, Arlington Oval was upgraded for $2.15 million with an installion of new pitch which replaced the existing natural grass surface which was in poor condition before then. The stadium was also upgraded with new lights, fencing and other general improvements.

References

Sports venues in Sydney
Rugby league stadiums in Australia
Soccer venues in Sydney
1932 establishments in Australia